Territorial Assembly elections were held in Niger on 31 March 1957. The result was a victory for the Sawaba party, which won 41 of the 60 seats.

Results

References

Elections in Niger
Niger
1957 in Niger
Election and referendum articles with incomplete results